Dumglow (379 m) is the highest peak of the Cleish Hills in Perth and Kinross, Scotland. It is located north of Dunfermline. An ancient fort lies on its summit.

References

Mountains and hills of Perth and Kinross
Marilyns of Scotland
Hill forts in Scotland